Kirigampamunuwa Grama Niladhari Division is a Grama Niladhari Division of the Homagama Divisional Secretariat  of Colombo District  of Western Province, Sri Lanka .  It has Grama Niladhari Division Code 588.

Kirigampamunuwa is a surrounded by the Mattegoda Central 'B', Mattegoda East, Deepangoda, Diyagama West, Kahathuduwa West, Rilawala, Siyambalagoda North and Mattegoda West  Grama Niladhari Divisions.

Demographics

Ethnicity 

The Kirigampamunuwa Grama Niladhari Division has a Sinhalese majority (97.9%) . In comparison, the Homagama Divisional Secretariat (which contains the Kirigampamunuwa Grama Niladhari Division) has a Sinhalese majority (98.1%)

Religion 

The Kirigampamunuwa Grama Niladhari Division has a Buddhist majority (94.8%) . In comparison, the Homagama Divisional Secretariat (which contains the Kirigampamunuwa Grama Niladhari Division) has a Buddhist majority (96.2%)

Grama Niladhari Divisions of Homagama Divisional Secretariat

References